was a JR West Kabe Line terminal station located in Akiota, Hiroshima, Japan. It closed on December 1, 2003 when operation of the line was discontinued/suspended between Kabe Station and Sandankyō Station.

The station had one side platform.

History
Opened on July 27, 1969.
Privatized on April 1, 1987.
Closed on December 1, 2003.

Around station
Sandan-kyō

External links
 Hiroden Bus Route

Railway stations in Hiroshima Prefecture
Kabe Line suspended stations
Railway stations in Japan opened in 1969
Railway stations closed in 2003